Michael Hahn (2 February 1758, Altdorf bei Böblingen - 20 January 1819, Sindlingen, now known as Jettingen bei Herrenberg) was a German Pietist, Theosophist and the founder of the Hahn'schen Gemeinschaft. His alleged forename Johann does not appear on his birth certificate.

Life

He was born into a peasant family on 2 February 1758, at Altdorf near Stuttgart.  At the age of seventeen he claimed to have had a vision lasting for three hours. From that time on he attended Pietist meetings, despite his father's opposition which drove him from his home.  He became a preacher, living on the estate of Duchess Frances at Sindlingen near Herrenberg in Württemberg, where he died on 20 January 1819.

Doctrine of the Restitution of All Things

Works
 Johann Michael Hahns Schriften. 15 Bände. Originalausgaben Fues, Tübingen (ab 1819), Nachauflagen M. Hahn'sche Gemeinschaft, Stuttgart (ab 1932).
Volume 1: Lieder über die Berg-Predigt Jesu, ... 1819.
Volume 2: Briefe über die Apostel-Geschichte, ... 1820.
Volume 3: Briefe und Lieder über die zweyte Epistel Pauli an die Corinther, ... 1820.
Volume 4: Briefe und Lieder über die Briefe Pauli an den Timotheus, ... 1820.
Volume 5: Briefe und Lieder über die heilige Offenbarung Jesu Christi, ... 2. Auflage. 1846.
Volume 6,1: Psalm 1 bis 66, ... 3. Auflage. 1853.
Volume 6,2: Psalm 67 bis Ende. 3. Auflage. 1853.
Volume 7: Betrachtungen auf alle Tage des Jahrs über den Brief Pauli an die Römer, ... 1849.
Volume 8: Betrachtungen auf alle Tage des Jahrs über einzelne biblische Texte, ... 1825.
Volume 9: Betrachtungen, Gebete und Lieder auf die Sonn-, Fest- und Feyertage, ... 1826.
Volume 10: Sammlung von auserlesenen geistlichen Gesängen zur Belehrung, ... 1827.
Volume 11: Send-Briefe über einzelne Kapitel aus dem alten Testament und den vier Evangelisten, ... 1855.
Volume 12: Send-Briefe über einzelne Capitel aus dem alten und neuen Testament und Antworten auf Fragen über Herzenserfahrungen, ... 1830.
Volume 13: Sendschreiben und Lieder an Freunde der Wahrheit als Antworten auf ihre Fragen. 1841.
Volume 14: Briefe von der ersten Offenbarung Gottes durch die ganze Schöpfung bis an das Ziel aller Dinge, ... 1825.
Volume 15: Sammlung auserlesener geistlicher Gesänge, ... 5. Auflage. 1891.

Bibliography
  W. F. Stroh: Die Lehre des württembergischen Theosophen Johann Michael Hahn, systematisch entwickelt. Steinkopf, Stuttgart 1859. 4. Auflage 1965, .
  Joseph Hahn: Bekanntes und Unbekanntes aus dem Leben des württembergischen Theosophen Johann Michael Hahn. Rohm, Lorch 1919. Neuauflage: Turm, Bietigheim 1983(?), .
  Weisheit im Staube – Ein Lesebuch der Schwabenväter Bengel, Oetinger, Fricker, Philipp Matthäus Hahn, Michael Hahn. Wunderlich, Tübingen, 1927.
  Johann Michael Hahn. Kurze Darstellung seines Lebens und seiner Lehre. M. Hahn'sche Gemeinschaft, Stuttgart, 1939. 3. Auflage 1961.
  Gottlob Lang: Michael Hahn. Ein Gottesmann im schwäbischen Bauerngewand. Lebensbild und Auswahl. Calwer, Stuttgart, 1962.
  Joachim Trautwein: Die Theosophie Michael Hahns und ihre Quellen. Calwer, Stuttgart 1969.
  Friedhelm Groth: Die "Wiederbringung aller Dinge" im Württembergischen Pietismus. Theologiegeschichtliche Studien zum eschatologischen Heilsuniversalismus württembergischer Pietisten des 18. Jahrhunderts. Arbeiten zur Geschichte des Pietismus, Band 21. Vandenhoeck und Ruprecht, Göttingen 1984, .
 (in German) Werner Raupp: „Wie Gott, was Gott und wo Gott sey?“ Michael Hahn, der gnostische Gottessucher aus Altdorf, in: Schwäbische Heimat. Zeitschrift für Regionalgeschichte, württembergische Landeskultur, Naturschutz und Denkmalpflege 59 (2008), No. 2, p. 142-148 (on the occasion of J. M. Hahn’s 150. birthday).

References

External links
 
 Works on and by Johann Michael Hahn in Deutsche Nationalbibliothek catalogue

 Johann Michael Hahn on heiligenlexikon.de
 Johann Michael Hahn on bible-only.org
 Grave in Sindlingen

1758 births
1819 deaths
People from Böblingen (district)
German Theosophists
People from the Duchy of Württemberg
Radical Pietism